In mathematics, Fujita's conjecture is a problem in the theories of algebraic geometry and complex manifolds, unsolved . It is named after Takao Fujita, who formulated it in 1985.

Statement
In complex geometry, the conjecture states that for a positive holomorphic line bundle L  on a compact complex manifold M, the line bundle KM ⊗ L⊗m (where KM is a canonical line bundle of M) is 
 spanned by sections when  m ≥ n + 1 ;
 very ample when m ≥ n + 2,

where n is the complex dimension of M.

Note that for large m the line bundle KM ⊗ L⊗m is very ample by the standard Serre's vanishing theorem (and its complex analytic variant). Fujita conjecture provides an explicit bound on m, which is optimal for projective spaces.

Known cases
For surfaces the Fujita conjecture follows from Reider's theorem. For three-dimensional algebraic varieties, Ein and Lazarsfeld in 1993 proved the first part of the Fujita conjecture, i.e. that m≥4 implies global generation.

See also 
Ohsawa–Takegoshi L2 extension theorem

References
.

.
.
.
.

External links 
supporting facts to fujita conjecture

Algebraic geometry
Complex manifolds
Conjectures
Unsolved problems in geometry